Atlético Club San Martín (popularly known as San Martín de Mendoza) is a football club from the city of San Martín in Mendoza Province, Argentina. The team currently plays in the Torneo Argentino B, which is the regionalised fourth division of the Argentine football league system.

Overview
San Martín de Mendoza has played 8 seasons at the top level of Argentine football, more specifically in the Torneo Nacional tournaments of 1967, 1969, 1971–74, 1976, 1978. San Martín's best ever finish was a third position in its zone, achieved in 1974 and 1978.

San Martín was relegated from Primera B Nacional at the end of 2005–06 after losing the playoff against San Martín de Tucumán. The club was then found guilty of match-fixing in the 2006–07 season. Therefore San Martín was punished with a 10-point deduction, which left the team in the relegation zone. San Martín finally was relegated for a second time in a year, this time to the Torneo Argentino B.

Trophies
Torneo Argentino A: 1
1996-97

See also
Argentine football league system
List of football clubs in Argentina

External links
Official website 

Football clubs in Mendoza Province
Association football clubs established in 1927
1927 establishments in Argentina